Kelly Ann Timilty (October 14, 1962 – January 31, 2012) was an American politician.

Biography
Timilty was born in Boston, Massachusetts. She went to St. Gregory's Grammar School in Dorchester, Massachusetts and to the Newton Country Day School. Timilty received her bachelor's degree from the University of Maryland, College Park in 1986. She worked as an aide for Congressman Joe Moakley of Massachusetts. Timilty lived in West Roxbury, Massachusetts. Timilty served on the Massachusetts Governor's Council from 1995 until her death in 2012. She was a Democrat. In 2008, Timilty was fined $8,000 for violating Massachusetts campaign laws when she falsely claimed in her campaign literature that Massachusetts Governor Deval Patrick was endorsing her. Timilty died in Dedham, Massachusetts after a short illness. Her father was Joseph F. Timilty who served in the Massachusetts Senate. Her husband was James "Jim" L. Mandeville.

Notes

1962 births
2012 deaths
Politicians from Boston
University of Maryland, College Park alumni
Women in Massachusetts politics
Massachusetts Democrats
Members of the Massachusetts Governor's Council
Timilty family
Massachusetts politicians convicted of crimes
People from West Roxbury, Boston
21st-century American women